Devínska Nová Ves is a borough of Bratislava, the capital of Slovakia. Its western borders are formed by the Morava River, which also forms the national border between Slovakia and Austria.

Devínska Nová Ves is notable mainly for its large Volkswagen factory, for Sandberg, a world-known palaeontological site, where many fossils of prehistoric animals are found , and for the a cyclist bridge over Morava river linking it with Schloss Hof in Austria. Devínska Nová Ves is the last train station in Slovakia on the railway line from Bratislava to Vienna.

Among other things, it is home to the largest Croatian community in Slovakia. Croatian is still spoken here, as well as in Čuňovo and Jarovce, villages on the southern bank of the Danube. The wider presence of Croatian settlers is represented by local place names such as Chorvátsky Grob.

Geography 
Devínska Nová Ves borders Devín to the south, the river Morava and Austria to the west, Záhorská Bystrica to the far north-east and Lamač and Dúbravka to the south-east.

Division 
Devínska Nová Ves is divided into 6 local parts: Devínske Jazero, Kostolné, Podhorské, Paulinské, Sídlisko Stred and Vápenka. Unofficially it is also locally divided into four further parts: "Stara Dedina", Kolónia, Grba and Slovinec.

History 
Devínska Nová Ves was mentioned for the first time around 1451 as Nová Ves. During the 17th century, the village was growing and after an influx of Croats, the village acquired the name Chorvátska Nová Ves. In the 18th century, a sand mine was built here near Sandberg and later in the 19th century, stone was quarried here as well. In 1848, the village was renamed once more to its current name. In 1918, the village was a site of battle between the Czechoslovak and Hungarian armies as part of fights for Bratislava, and Czechoslovak troops emerged victorious. In 1948, Devínska Nová Ves was near the border of two different political systems, and in 1955 the Iron Curtain was constructed across the territory the village. It was also one of the escape routes to Austria, by swimming across the Morava river. On 1 January 1972, Devínska Nová Ves was made an official borough of Bratislava. In the 1970s and 1980s, new auto plants were built, first Bratislavské automobilové závody (BAZ, later a factory of Volkswagen), which spurred the construction of new apartment blocks in the borough in the late 1980s. In the early 1990s, the Iron Curtain was dismantled.

In part Kostolné there is the Holy Spirit's Church, which is on the list of cultural monuments of Slovakia. This church is situated on small hill over square and archaeological excavations certify its existence as sepulchral place since prehistory. Literature says it was built in renaissance style about year 1580. It is built from stone with a tile roof.

Transport 
Devínska Nová Ves lies near the railways to Austria and the Czech Republic. Road traffic is some of the worst in Bratislava, because all of the access roads are busy and narrow. Relocation of these roads is planned to begin soon. In the future, there will be a motorway border crossing to Austria.

Public transportation uses buses and is stressed as well, because the centre is quite distant, and buses are often late. More popular are therefore trains running to Main station twice an hour. In future, railway stop "Devínska Nová Ves - Sídlisko" is planned above Eisnerova street.

A cycle bridge has been constructed across the nearby Morava River, linking Devínska Nová Ves to Schlosshoff castle and Marchegg, in Austria. The project was completed by November

People 
Devínska Nová Ves houses the greatest Croat minority in Slovakia and the Festival of Croatian Culture takes place annually.

Notable peoples 
 Simon Knéfacz Croatian writer
 Rudolf Sloboda Slovak writer
 Peter Pišťanek Slovak writer

Gallery

References

External links 

  
 Unofficial website 
Devinska Nova Ves - Spectacular Slovakia

Boroughs of Bratislava
Croatian communities in Slovakia
Villages in Slovakia merged with towns